Cross Plains High School is a public high school located in Cross Plains, Texas (USA) and classified as a 2A school by the UIL. It is part of the Cross Plains Independent School District located in southeastern Callahan County. In 2015, the school was rated "Met Standard" by the Texas Education Agency.

Athletics
The Cross Plains Buffaloes compete in these sports - 

Baseball
Basketball
Cross Country
Football
Golf
Powerlifting
Softball
Tennis
Track and Field

State Titles
Girls Track - 
1994 (1A), 2014(1A/D2)

References

External links
Cross Plains ISD
Cross Plains Exes

Schools in Callahan County, Texas
Public high schools in Texas